A festival marketplace is a European-style shopping market in the United States.  It is an effort to revitalize downtown areas in major US cities begun in the late 20th century.

Festival marketplaces were a leading downtown revitalization strategy in American cities during the 1970s and 1980s. The guiding principles are a mix of local tenants instead of regional or national chain stores, design of shop stalls and common areas to energize the space, and uncomplicated architectural ornament in order to highlight the goods.

List of festival marketplaces

 Aloha Tower Marketplace — Honolulu, Hawaii
 Arizona Center — Phoenix, Arizona
 Bandana Square — Saint Paul, Minnesota
 Bayside Marketplace — Miami, Florida
 Cambridgeside Galleria — Cambridge, Massachusetts
 Canalside — Buffalo, New York
Catfish Town — Baton Rouge, Louisiana
 The Continent — Columbus, Ohio
 Cray Plaza — Saint Paul, Minnesota
 Faneuil Hall — Boston, Massachusetts
 Festival Market — Lexington, Kentucky
 Ghirardelli Square — San Francisco, California
 Harborplace — Baltimore, Maryland
 Harbour Island - Tampa, Florida 
 Jack London Square — Oakland, California
 Jackson Brewery — New Orleans, Louisiana
 Jacksonville Landing — Jacksonville, Florida
 Navy Pier — Chicago, Illinois
 Old Post Office Pavilion — Washington, D.C.
 Pier 39 — San Francisco, California
 Portside Festival Marketplace — Toledo, Ohio
 Riverwalk — New Orleans, Louisiana
 Sixth Street Festival Marketplace — Richmond, Virginia
 South Street Seaport — New York City, New York
 Saint Anthony Main — Minneapolis, Minnesota
 St. Louis Union Station — St. Louis, Missouri
 Station Square — Pittsburgh, Pennsylvania
 Tower City Center — Cleveland, Ohio
 Trolley Square — Salt Lake City, Utah
 Underground Atlanta — Atlanta, Georgia
 Union Station — Indianapolis, Indiana
 Union Station — Washington, D.C.
 Water Street Pavilion — Flint, Michigan
 Waterside — Norfolk, Virginia
 West End Marketplace — Dallas, Texas
 Westfield Horton Plaza — San Diego, California

See also
Lifestyle center (retail)

References 

Shopping malls by type
New Urbanism